Aporoctena is a genus of moths in the family Geometridae.

Species
 Aporoctena aprepes (Turner, 1904)
 Aporoctena scierodes Meyrick, 1892

References
 Aporoctena at Markku Savela's Lepidoptera and Some Other Life Forms

Nacophorini
Geometridae genera